The proton-coupled folate transporter is a protein that in humans is encoded by the SLC46A1 gene. The major physiological roles of PCFTs are in mediating the intestinal absorption of folate (Vitamin B9), and its delivery to the central nervous system.

Structure
PCFT is located on chromosome 17q11.2 and consists of five exons encoding a protein with 459 amino acids and a MW of ~50kDa. PCFT is highly conserved, sharing 87% identity to the mouse and rat PCFT and retaining more than 50% amino acid identity to the frog (XP415815) and zebrafish (AAH77859) proteins. Structurally, there are twelve transmembrane helices with the N- and C- termini directed to the cytoplasm and a large internal loop that divides the molecule in half. There are two glycosylation sites (N58, N68) and a disulfide bond connecting residues C66, in the 1st and C298 in the 4th, external loop. Neither glycosylation nor the disulfide bond are essential for function.  Residues have been identified that play a role in proton-coupling, proton binding, folate binding and oscillation of the carrier between its conformational states.  PCFT forms oligomers and some of the linking residues have been identified.

Properties and Regulation
PCFT-mediated transport into cells is optimal at pH 5.5. The low-pH activity and the structural specificity of PCFT (high affinity for folic acid, and low affinity for PT523 - a non-polyglutamable analog of aminopterin) distinguishes this transporter functionally from the other major folate transporter, the reduced folate carrier (optimal activity at pH 7.4, very low affinity for folic acid and very high affinity for PT523), another member (SLC19A1) of the superfamily of solute transporters. Influx mediated by PCFT is electrogenic and can be assessed by current, cellular acidification, and  radiotracer uptake. Influx has a Km range of 0.5 to 3µM for most folates and antifolates at pH 5.5. The influx Km rises and the influx Vmax falls as the pH is increased, least so for the antifolate, pemetrexed. The transporter is specific for the monoglutamyl forms of folates. A variety of organic anions inhibit PCFT-mediated transport at extremely high ratio of inhibitor to folate, the most potent are sulfobromophthalein, p-aminobenzylglutamate, and sulfathalazine. This may have pharmacological relevance in terms of the inhibitory effect of these agents on the intestinal absorption of folates. The PCFT minimal promoter has been defined and contains an NRF1 response element. There is also evidence for a role of vitamin D in the regulation of PCFT with a VDR response element upstream of the minimal promoter. PCFT mRNA was reported to be increased in folate-deficient mice.

Pattern of Expression
PCFT is expressed in the proximal jejunum with a lower level of expression elsewhere in the intestine. Expression is localized to the apical membrane of intestinal  and polarized MDCK dog kidney cells. PCFT is also expressed at the basolateral membrane of the choroid plexus. In view of the low levels of folate in the cerebrospinal fluid (CSF) in PCFT-null humans, PCFT must play a role in transport of folates across the choroid plexus into the CSF; however, the underlying mechanism for this has not been established. PCFT is expressed at the sinusoidal (basolateral) membrane of the hepatocyte, the apical brush-border membrane of the proximal tubule of the kidney, the basolateral membrane of the retinal pigment epithelium and the placenta. There is a prominent low-pH folate transport activity in the cells and/or membrane vesicles derived from these tissues which, in some cases, has been shown to be indicative of a proton-coupled folate transport process. However, it is unclear as to the extent that PCFT contributes to folate transport across these epithelia.

Consequences of the loss-of-function of PCFT
The physiological role of PCFT is known based upon the phenotype of subjects with loss-of-function mutations of this gene – the rare autosomal hereditary disorder, hereditary folate malabsorption (HFM). These subjects have two major abnormalities: (i) severe systemic folate deficiency and (ii) a defect in the transport of folates from blood across the choroid plexus into the CSF with very low CSF folate levels even when the blood folate level is corrected or supranormal.  Severe anemia, usually macrocytic, always accompanies the folate deficiency. Sometimes there is pancytopenia and/or hypogammaglobulinemia and/or T-cell dysfunction which can result in infections such as Pneumocystis jirovecii pneumonia. There can be GI signs including diarrhea and mucositis. The CNS folate deficiency is associated with a variety of neurological findings including developmental delays and seizures. The phenotype of the PCFT-null mouse has been reported and mirrors many of the findings in humans. PCFT was initially reported to be a low-affinity heme transporter. However, a role for PCFT in heme and iron homeostasis is excluded by the observation that humans or mice with loss-of-function PCFT mutations are not iron or heme deficient and the anemia, and all other systemic consequences of the loss of this transporter, are completely corrected with high-dose oral, or low-dose, parenteral folate.

Potential pharmacological role 
Because of the Warburg effect, and a compromised blood supply, human epithelial cancers grow within an acidic milieu, as lactate is produced during anaerobic glycolysis. Because PCFT activity is optimal at low pH, and its expression and a prominent low-pH transport activity are present in human cancers, there is interest in exploiting these properties by the development of antifolates that have a high affinity for this transporter and a very low affinity for the reduced folate carrier which delivers antifolates to normal tissues and thereby mediates the toxicity of these agents. A novel class of inhibitors of one carbon incorporation into purines is being developed with these properties. Pemetrexed, an antifolate inhibitor primarily of thymidylate synthase, is a good substrate for PCFT even at neutral pH as compared to other antifolates and folates.

References

Solute carrier family